Parallel Realities is an album by drummer Jack DeJohnette with guitarist Pat Metheny and pianist Herbie Hancock recorded in 1990 and released on the MCA label. The Allmusic review by Ron Wynn states, "An overlooked session with Pat Metheny in definite jazz phase. Herbie Hancock shows his steadfast piano form".

Track listing
All compositions by Jack DeJohnette except as indicated

Personnel
Jack DeJohnette – drums, keyboard bass
Pat Metheny – acoustic and electric guitar, synclavier, keyboards
Herbie Hancock – piano, keyboards

Note
Recorded 1990 at Dreamland Recording Studios, West Hurley, NY

References

Jack DeJohnette albums
1990 albums
MCA Records albums
Pat Metheny albums